Davos Wiesen (local) is a village and one of six parts (former municipalities) of the municipality of Davos besides Davos Dorf, Davos Platz, Davos Frauenkirch, Davos Glaris and Davos Monstein.

References

External links

 Official website of Davos Wiesen 
 Official website of Davos 

Former municipalities of Graubünden
Davos